4S may refer to:

Places
 4S Ranch, California, an unincorporated community in San Diego County

Other uses
 iPhone 4S, the 5th generation of the iPhone
 Scandinavian Simvastatin Survival Study, a multicenter clinical trial that was performed in 1990s in Scandinavia
 Society for Social Studies of Science, a non-profit scholarly association devoted to the social studies of science and technology
 Toshiba 4S, a nuclear reactor
 Toyota S engine
 DS 4S, a car
 4S, the production code for the 1977 Doctor Who serial The Talons of Weng-Chiang

See also

S4 (disambiguation)
SSSS (disambiguation)
Fours (disambiguation)
S (disambiguation)
4 (disambiguation)